2 X Again is a compilation album by American shred guitarist Michael Angelo Batio released on November 5, 2007. It features songs from Batio's first two studio albums – No Boundaries and Planet Gemini – remixed and remastered, with additional drums from Joe Babiak. Also included are two demo tracks from the No Boundaries sessions: "Acoustic" and "Allegory of the Cave".

Track listing

Personnel
Michael Angelo Batio – electric guitars, acoustic guitars, bass, keyboards, production, engineering
Joe Babiak – drums
Chris Djuricic – mixing, drum engineering
James Murphy – mastering
Paul Kuhr – design, concept, layout
Stephen Jensen – photography

References

Michael Angelo Batio compilation albums
2007 compilation albums
M.A.C.E. Music compilation albums